Robert Bruce Propst (July 13, 1931 – May 14, 2019) was a senior United States district judge of the United States District Court for the Northern District of Alabama.

Education and career
Propst was born in Ohatchee, Alabama and graduated from Gadsden High School. He received a Bachelor of Science degree in commerce from the University of Alabama in 1953 and a Juris Doctor from the University of Alabama School of Law in 1957. He was in the United States Army from 1953 to 1955 and was the deputy finance and accounting officer at Camp Stewart, Georgia. He became a first lieutenant. He was in private practice in Anniston, Alabama from 1957 to 1980.

Federal judicial service

On January 10, 1980, Propst was nominated by President Jimmy Carter to a new seat on the United States District Court for the Northern District of Alabama created by 92 Stat. 1629. He was confirmed by the United States Senate on May 29, 1980, and received his commission on May 30, 1980. He assumed senior status on July 15, 1996. Propst died on May 14, 2019, aged 87.

References

Sources
 

1931 births
2019 deaths
People from Calhoun County, Alabama
Judges of the United States District Court for the Northern District of Alabama
United States district court judges appointed by Jimmy Carter
20th-century American judges
University of Alabama alumni
University of Alabama School of Law alumni
Military personnel from Alabama
United States Army officers